Leptostigma is a genus of flowering plants belonging to the family Rubiaceae.

Its native range is Southeastern Australia, New Zealand, Andes.

Species:

Leptostigma arnottianum 
Leptostigma breviflorum 
Leptostigma longiflorum 
Leptostigma pilosum 
Leptostigma reptans 
Leptostigma setulosum 
Leptostigma weberbaueri

References

Rubiaceae
Rubiaceae genera